Brady Sallee is an American women's college basketball coach, currently head coach for Ball State University. He previously held the same position at Eastern Illinois University (EIU) in Charleston, Illinois.

Biography
A native of Lexington, Kentucky, Sallee played collegiate baseball and served as a student assistant with the women's basketball team at Thomas More College in Crestview Hills, Kentucky from 1990 to '93, earning his bachelor's degree in business administration in 1993.  Sallee and his wife Mandy have three children: Avery, Taryn and Drew.

Coaching career
After graduating from Thomas More, Sallee spent two years as assistant coach and recruiting coordinator at Idaho State University. He was then in the same jobs for seven years with the Kent State Golden Flashes, where his recruiting was credited with being largely responsible for the program's success during his time there. Next came two seasons performing the same jobs at East Carolina, where the athletic director called him, "...an excellent recruiter..." when announcing his appointment as coach at Eastern Illinois on April 26, 2004.  When he took over the EIU program, Sallee first built a solid foundation and then lead the Panthers to the school's most successful string of seasons in Division I.  On May 11, 2012, Sallee was named the eleventh women's basketball head coach at Ball State University in Muncie, Indiana. On December 4, 2017, Sallee lead Ball State to its first win over state rival Purdue since 1979, snapping a 16-game losing streak to the Boilermakers. In the 2019–20 season, Sallee orchestrated a 13-game turnaround from the 2018–19 season which was good for the 30th largest single-season turnaround in NCAA Division I Women's Basketball.

Head coaching record
Source

References

External links
Ball State Cardinals coaching bio

Year of birth missing (living people)
Living people
American women's basketball coaches
Ball State Cardinals women's basketball coaches
Basketball coaches from Kentucky
East Carolina Pirates women's basketball coaches
Eastern Illinois Panthers women's basketball coaches
Idaho State Bengals women's basketball coaches
Kent State Golden Flashes women's basketball coaches
Sportspeople from Lexington, Kentucky
Thomas More Saints baseball players
Baseball players from Lexington, Kentucky